Route 540, or Highway 540, may refer to:

Canada
 Alberta Highway 540
 New Brunswick Route 540
 Ontario Highway 540
 Ontario Highway 540A
 Ontario Highway 540B
 Quebec Autoroute 540

United Kingdom
 A540 road

United States
  Interstate 540 (disambiguation)
  Arkansas Highway 540 (former)
  Florida State Road 540
  County Road 540 (Polk County, Florida)
  Georgia State Route 540
  Hawaii Route 540
  Maryland Route 540
  County Route 540 (New Jersey)
  North Carolina Highway 540
  Ohio State Route 540
  Oregon Route 540
  Virginia State Route 540 (1931)
  Puerto Rico Highway 540
  Washington State Route 540